Jacobite Relics is a two volume collection of songs related to the Jacobite risings, compiled by the Scottish poet and novelist James Hogg on commission from the Highland Society of London in 1817. Most of the songs in the collection are Jacobite, and a minority are Whig. A number of the songs were written or adapted by Robert Burns and scholars speculate as to how many of them were authored or at least substantially altered by Hogg himself.	  
		 
The first volume was published in 1819 under the title The Jacobite Relics of Scotland; Being the Songs, Airs, and Legends, of the Adherents to the House of Stuart.  The second volume was published in 1821. An edited version of the work was published in 2002 (Volume 1) and 2003 (Volume 2) by Edinburgh University Press as Volumes 10 and 12 of the Stirling/South Carolina Research Edition of The Complete Works of James Hogg. The editor was Murray G. H. Pittock. 
		
After being revived by Ewan MacColl, several of the songs included gained new popularity in the 20th century through performances by musicians such as The Corries, Steeleye Span and Eddi Reader, among others – most notably Ye Jacobites (#34), Cam Ye O'er Frae France (#53) and Such a Parcel of Rogues in a Nation (#36).

The numbered songs (with music)

1 - The King shall enjoy his own again
2 - The Haughs of Cromdale
3 - Lesley's March to Scotland
4 - Lesley's March to Longmaston Moor
5 - The Restoration
6 - The Royal Oak Tree
7 - Tree of Friendship
8 - The Drowning of Care
9 - Hey, then, up go we
10 - You're welcome, Whigs, from Bothwell Brigs
11 - Cakes o' Crowdy
12 - There cam' a Fiddler out o' Fife
13 - Ne'er to return
14 - King William's March
15 - It was a' for our rightfu' King
16 - Three good Fellows ayont you Glen
17 - The Battle of Killicrankie
18 - Prælium Gilliecrankianum
19 - Killicrankie
20 - The Devil o'er Stirling
21 - Willie the Wag
22 - The Cameronian Cat
23 - Come, an the King come
24 - Willie Winkie's Testament
25 - The Act of Succession
26 - Would you know what a Whig is
27 - When the King comes o'er the Water
28 - Freedom's Farewell
29 - Come, fill your Bowls
30 - The King shall enjoy his own
31 - Here's a Health to them that's away
32 - Over the Seas and far awa
33 - I hae nae Kith, I hae nae Kin
34 - Ye Jacobites by Name (Roud 5517)
35 - My Love he was a Highland Lad
36 - Such a Parcel of Rogues in a Nation
37 - This is no my ain House
38 - There'll never be Peace till Jamie comes hame
39 - The Awkward Squad
40 - The Union
41 - The Thistle and the Rose
42 - Queen Anne; or, The Auld Gray Mare
43 - Bishop Burnet's Descent into Hell
44 - A wicked old Peer
45 - Sarum's Dirge
46 - Awa, Whigs awa
47 - The Broad Swords of Scotland
48 - There was a Man came from the Moon
49 - At Auchindown
50 - The Riding Mare
51 - The wee wee German Lairdie
52 - The Ringing o't
53 - Come ye o'er frae France
54 - Let our great James come over
55 - The Sow's Tail to Geordie
56 - Plain Truth
57 - The Pilfering Brood
58 - Kirn-milk Geordie
59 - Come, let us drink a Health, Boys
60 - Donald Macgillavry
61 - Jamie, the Rover
62 - The Curses
63 - Perfidious Britain
64 - The Thistle of Scotland
65 - Frae the Friend, and Land I love
66 - Here's to the King, Sir
67 - The Cuckoo
68 - The Rebellious Crew
69 - My Laddie
70 - Geordie Whelps' Testament
71 - O, royal James
72 - The auld Stuarts back again
73 - Down among the Dead Men
74 - Robin John Clark
75 - Both Sides the Tweed
76 - The Fifth of November
77 - The Bonny Moorhen
78 - The Waes o' Scotland
79 - Lochmaben Gate
80 - Hame, Hame, Hame
81 - Our ain Country
82 - Marilla
83 - A South-Sea Ballad
84 - O, beautiful Britannia
85 - Nobody can deny
86 - James, come kiss me now
87 - What Murrain now has ta'en the Whigs
88 - True Blue
89 - Will ye go to Sheriffmuir (Aikendrum) (Roud 2571)
90 - The Chevalier's Muster-Roll

Jacobite songs listed in the appendix (without music)

A Tory in a Whig's Coat
John Hielandman's Visit to the Quarter Session
Albany
The Cannons now are at a Stand
The Removal of the Parliament from London to Oxford
Donald Cowper
Information
The Present State of England
Titus Telltroth
Ignoramus
The Man of Fashion
The Loyal Health
A Narrative of the old Plot; being a new Song
Jack Presbyter's Wish
The Pot-Companions
The Protestant Flail
The Royal Litany
The Loyal Conqast
Whig upon Whig
Eustace Comines, the Irish Evidence, his Farewell to England
Dagon's Fall
Lament for the Apprehending of Sir Thomas Armstrong
Pluto, the Prince of Darkness, &c
The Whigs exposed
An excellent new Song, &c
The Royal Admiral
The Happy Return of the Old Dutch Miller
There's none so happy as we
Patience Ward
Hail to the Prince of the Plot
Honest Redcoat
The Western Rebel
The Loyal Irishman
The Plot is rent and torn
A new Litany
The Constitution restored in 1711

Whig songs listed in the appendix (without music)

Hogg states that he believed that these were all of English origin

Fifth of November
Song on the Thirtieth of January 1696
A Health
King William's Birth-Day
Haste over, Hanover, fast as you can over
Loyalty displayed, &c
The French King's Thanks and Advice, &c
The Age of Wonders
Tantivy Tory
Nothing but Truth
God prosper long this freeborn Isle
The Truth at last
If now at last we must give up Spain
George at last shall war the Crown
The Merchant a-la-Mode
A Litany
Hey, Boys, up go we
The First Psalm
Advice to Britons
The High-Church Alarm
The Raree Show
Raree Show
First of August
First of August
First of August
First of August
No Popery here shall thrive
Tories' Lamentation
Vile Tricksters and Greggsters
Advice to the Tories
King George's Birth-Day
Now, now is come the glorious Year
Brunswick Mum
That Protestants with Protestants
On his Majesty's Coronation
Here's a Health to the King
No more the Danger of the Church
Rue and Tyme
On the Breaking out of the Rebellion
The High-Church shall never make Perkin a King
The Pretender's Army

References

External links
Digitised copy of volumes 1 and 2 of The Relics of Jacobite Scotland by James Hogg printed between 1819 and 1821, from National Library of Scotland. JPEG, PDF, XML versions.
The Jacobite Relics of Scotland

Scottish literature
Jacobite songs
Works by James Hogg